Heaven Tonight is Cheap Trick's third studio album, produced by Tom Werman and released in 1978. The album was remastered and released with bonus tracks on Sony's Epic/Legacy imprint in 1998. The album cover features lead singer Robin Zander and bassist Tom Petersson on the front, with Rick Nielsen and Bun E. Carlos on the back.

Heaven Tonight is considered Cheap Trick's best album by many fans and critics. While their debut album Cheap Trick showed the band's darker, rawer side and In Color explored a lighter, more pop-oriented persona, Heaven Tonight combined both elements to produce a hook-filled pop-rock album with an attitude. Popular songs from this album include the anthemic "Surrender", "Auf Wiedersehen", the title track, and a cover of The Move's "California Man".

Heaven Tonight is also known as the first album ever recorded with a 12-string electric bass.

Overview
This was the second Cheap Trick album to feature Robin Zander and Tom Petersson on the front cover and Bun E. Carlos and Rick Nielsen on the back. While the front cover has Zander and Petersson standing in front of a nondescript background, the back cover portion (part of a continuous, wrap-around shot on the original LP) reveals that they are standing inside a public restroom where Nielsen is brushing his teeth and Carlos is fixing his tie in the mirror. Nielsen has a cassette copy of the band's previous album, In Color sticking out of his back pocket. At the suggestion of the record company, the album was originally to be called American Standard; the cover photography was intended to play upon the secondary association with the well-known manufacturer of plumbing fixtures. The band were less pleased with the idea and opted for the release title, but the cover design remained.

"Surrender" was the only song from this album released on the original version of the 1979 live album Cheap Trick at Budokan.  On the 1998 reissue At Budokan: The Complete Concert, three additional songs from this album were included - "Auf Wiedersehen", "High Roller"  and "California Man".

"Oh Claire" is a one-minute live jam with "Oh, konnichi wa" as the only lyrics. The title is a pun on Eau Claire, Wisconsin, where the band used to play frequently in their pre-stardom days. Cheap Trick wrote a similarly titled song, "O Claire," for their 2006 album Rockford. "How Are You" contains, in its second verse, the extract of "The Lord's Prayer", sped up 10 times and inserted between the lyrics 'you lie, you lie.' For the Epic Legacy release (1998), the original version of this track was replaced by a studio outtake with tabla drums and acoustic guitar instead of the electric version - no mention of this was made on the CD sleeve.

"Surrender" is featured as a playable song on the video game Guitar Hero II with the outro from At Budokan used in the game. It is also featured in the soundtrack to EA's video game Skate.

Track listing

Personnel

Cheap Trick
 Robin Zander – lead vocals, rhythm guitar
 Rick Nielsen – lead guitar, harpsichord, cello, mandocello, backing vocals
 Tom Petersson – bass, backing vocals
 Bun E. Carlos – drums

Additional musicians
 Jai Winding – keyboards

Technical
 Tom Werman – producer
 Gary Ladinsky – engineer
 Mike Beiriger – assistant engineer
 George Marino – mastering
 Jim Charne, Paula Scher – design
 Reid Miles – photography

Charts

Album

2017 reissue

Singles
Surrender

Certifications

References

Cheap Trick albums
Albums produced by Tom Werman
1978 albums
Epic Records albums
Albums recorded at Record Plant (Los Angeles)
Albums recorded at Sound City Studios